Events from the year 1738 in France

Incumbents
 Monarch – Louis XV

Events
18 November – Signing of the Treaty of Vienna

Births

31 May – Stanislas de Boufflers, statesman and writer (died 1815)
22 June – Jacques Delille, poet and translator (died 1813)
28 August – Etteilla, occult cartomancer (died 1791)
Full date missing – Philippe-Étienne Lafosse, veterinarian (died 1820)

Deaths
6 January – Jean-Baptiste Labat, clergyman, botanist and writer (born 1663)
15 January – Claude de Beauharnais, nobleman (born 1680)
30 January – Benoît de Maillet, diplomat and natural historian (born 1656)
9 February – Béatrice Hiéronyme de Lorraine, Abbess of Remiremont (born 1662)
5 June – Isaac de Beausobre, exiled Protestant pastor (born 1659)
7 June – Antoine Crozat, proprietary owner of French Louisiana (born c.1655)
8 July  – Jean-Pierre Nicéron, lexicographer (born 1685)
Full date missing
De Lafontaine, ballerina (born 1655)
Jean-Louis d'Usson, ambassador (born 1672)

See also

References

1730s in France